Rafael Delorme Salto (1867-1897),  born in the province of Malaga was a Spanish writer, journalist, and freethinker. He was a defender of the autonomy of Cuba and the author of several works of a historical and political nature.

Work

Books 

 The aborigines of America. Disquisitions about the seat, origin, history and advancement in the scientific sphere of pre-Columbian societies . Foreword by D. Vicente Riva-Palacio and Guerrero, Madrid: Bookstore of Fernando Faith / The Literary Propaganda, 1894.
 Cuba and the colonial reform in Spain . Madrid. Imp. D. Pacheco, 1895.
 Necessity of lay teaching and reforms to be introduced into it. Memory read by Rafael Delorme Salto at the Republican Youth session held on March 18, 1890. Madrid: Ricardo Fé's typographic establishment, 1890.

References

External links 

 Wikimedia Commons hosts a multimedia category on Rafael Delorme

1867 births
1897 deaths
19th-century male writers
Spanish writers